Mary Flannery O'Connor (March 25, 1925August 3, 1964) was an American novelist, short story writer and essayist. She wrote two novels and 31 short stories, as well as a number of reviews and commentaries.

She was a Southern writer who often wrote in a sardonic Southern Gothic style and relied heavily on regional settings and grotesque characters, often in violent situations. The unsentimental acceptance or rejection of the limitations or imperfections or differences of these characters (whether attributed to disability, race, crime, religion or sanity) typically underpins the drama.

Her writing reflected her Roman Catholic faith and frequently examined questions of Catholicism-defined morality and ethics. Her posthumously compiled Complete Stories won the 1972 U.S. National Book Award for Fiction and has been the subject of enduring praise.

Early life and education

Childhood
O'Connor was born on March 25, 1925, in Savannah, Georgia, the only child of Edward Francis O'Connor, a real estate agent, and Regina Cline, who were both of Irish descent. As an adult, she remembered herself as a "pigeon-toed child with a receding chin and a you-leave-me-alone-or-I'll-bite-you complex". The Flannery O'Connor Childhood Home museum is located at 207 E. Charlton Street on Lafayette Square.

In 1940, O'Connor and her family moved to Milledgeville, Georgia, where they initially lived with her mother's family at the so-called 'Cline mansion', in town. In 1937, her father had been diagnosed with systemic lupus erythematosus; it led to his eventual death on February 1, 1941, and O'Connor and her mother continued to live in Milledgeville. In 1951, they moved to Andalusia Farm, which is now a museum dedicated to O'Connor's work.

School
O'Connor attended Peabody High School, where she worked as the school newspaper's art editor and from which she graduated in 1942. She entered Georgia State College for Women (now Georgia College & State University) in an accelerated three-year program and graduated in June 1945 with a B.A. in sociology and English literature. While at Georgia College, she produced a significant amount of cartoon work for the student newspaper. Many critics have claimed that the idiosyncratic style and approach of these early cartoons shaped her later fiction in important ways.

In 1945, she was accepted into the prestigious Iowa Writers' Workshop at the University of Iowa, where she first went to study journalism. While there, she got to know several important writers and critics who lectured or taught in the program, among them Robert Penn Warren, John Crowe Ransom, Robie Macauley, Austin Warren and Andrew Lytle. Lytle, for many years editor of the Sewanee Review, was one of the earliest admirers of her fiction. He later published several of her stories in the Sewanee Review, as well as critical essays on her work. Workshop director Paul Engle was the first to read and comment on the initial drafts of what would become Wise Blood. She received an M.F.A. from the University of Iowa in 1947. She remained at the Iowa Writers' Workshop for another year after completing her degree on a fellowship. During the summer of 1948, O'Connor continued to work on Wise Blood at Yaddo, an artists' community in Saratoga Springs, New York, where she also completed several short stories.

In 1949 O'Connor met and eventually accepted an invitation to stay with Robert Fitzgerald (a well-known translator of the classics) and his wife, Sally, in Ridgefield, Connecticut.

Career
O'Connor is primarily known for her short stories. She published two books of short stories: A Good Man Is Hard to Find (1955) and Everything That Rises Must Converge (published posthumously in 1965).  Many of O'Connor's short stories have been re-published in major anthologies, including The Best American Short Stories and Prize Stories.

O'Connor's two novels are Wise Blood (1952) (made into a film by John Huston) and The Violent Bear It Away (1960). She also has had several books of her other writings published, and her enduring influence is attested by a growing body of scholarly studies of her work.

Fragments exist of an unfinished novel tentatively titled Why Do the Heathen Rage? that draws from several of her short stories, including "Why Do the Heathen Rage?," "The Enduring Chill," and "The Partridge Festival".

Her writing career can be divided into four five-year periods of increasing skill and ambition, 1945 to 1964:
 Postgraduate Student: Iowa Writers' Workshop, first published stories, drafts of Wise Blood. Literary influences include Nathaniel Hawthorne, Edgar Allan Poe, Henry James 
 Early: Wise Blood completed and published. In this period, satirical elements dominate. Influences include Jacques Maritain.
 Middle: A Good Man Is Hard to Find published, The Violent Bear It Away written and published. Influences include Friedrich von Hügel. In this period, the mystical undercurrents begin to have primacy.
 Mature: Everything That Rises Must Converge written. Influences include Pierre Teilhard de Chardin and Mary Anne Long. In this period, the notion of grotesque is expanded to include the good as grotesque, and the grotesque as good.

Characteristics
Regarding her emphasis of the grotesque, O'Connor said: "[A]nything that comes out of the South is going to be called grotesque by the northern reader, unless it is grotesque, in which case it is going to be called realistic." Her texts usually take place in the South and revolve around morally flawed characters, frequently interacting with people with disabilities or disabled themselves (as O'Connor was), while the issue of race often appears. Most of her works feature disturbing elements, though she did not like to be characterized as cynical. "I am mighty tired of reading reviews that call A Good Man brutal and sarcastic," she wrote. "The stories are hard but they are hard because there is nothing harder or less sentimental than Christian realism... When I see these stories described as horror stories I am always amused because the reviewer always has hold of the wrong horror."

She felt deeply informed by the sacramental and by the Thomist notion that the created world is charged with God. Yet she did not write apologetic fiction of the kind prevalent in the Catholic literature of the time, explaining that a writer's meaning must be evident in his or her fiction without didacticism. She wrote ironic, subtly allegorical fiction about deceptively backward Southern characters, usually fundamentalist Protestants, who undergo transformations of character that, to her thinking, brought them closer to the Catholic mind. The transformation is often accomplished through pain, violence, and ludicrous behavior in the pursuit of the holy. However grotesque the setting, she tried to portray her characters as open to the touch of divine grace. This ruled out a sentimental understanding of the stories' violence, as of her own illness. She wrote: "Grace changes us and the change is painful."

She also had a deeply sardonic sense of humor, often based in the disparity between her characters' limited perceptions and the awesome fate awaiting them. Another source of humor is frequently found in the attempt of well-meaning liberals to cope with the rural South on their own terms. O'Connor used such characters' inability to come to terms with disability, race, poverty, and fundamentalism, other than in sentimental illusions, to illustrate her view that the secular world was failing in the twentieth century.

In several stories, O'Connor explored some of the most sensitive contemporary issues that her liberal and fundamentalist characters might encounter. She addressed the Holocaust in her story "The Displaced Person", racial integration in "Everything That Rises Must Converge" and intersexuality in "A Temple of the Holy Ghost". Her fiction often included references to the problem of race in the South; occasionally, racial issues come to the forefront, as in "The Artificial Nigger", "Everything that Rises Must Converge", and "Judgement Day", her last short story and a drastically rewritten version of her first published story, "The Geranium".

Despite her secluded life, her writing reveals an uncanny grasp of the nuances of human behavior. O'Connor gave many lectures on faith and literature, traveling quite far despite her frail health. Politically, she maintained a broadly progressive outlook in connection with her faith, voting for John F. Kennedy in 1960 and supporting the work of Martin Luther King Jr. and the civil rights movement.

Illness and death

By the summer of 1952, O'Connor was diagnosed with systemic lupus erythematosus (lupus), as her father had been before her. She remained for the rest of her life on Andalusia. O'Connor lived for twelve years after her diagnosis, seven years longer than expected.

Her daily routine was to attend Mass, write in the morning, then spend the rest of the day recuperating and reading. Despite the debilitating effects of the steroid drugs used to treat O'Connor's lupus, she nonetheless made over sixty appearances at lectures to read her works.

In the PBS documentary, Flannery, the writer Alice McDermott explains the impact lupus had on O'Connor's work, saying, "It was the illness, I think, which made her the writer she is."

O'Connor completed more than two dozen short stories and two novels while living with lupus. She died on August 3, 1964, at the age of 39 in Baldwin County Hospital. Her death was caused by complications from a new attack of lupus following surgery for a uterine fibroid. She was buried in Milledgeville, Georgia, at Memory Hill Cemetery.

Letters
Throughout her life, O'Connor maintained a wide correspondence, with writers that included Robert Lowell and Elizabeth Bishop, English professor Samuel Ashley Brown, and playwright Maryat Lee. After her death, a selection of her letters, edited by her friend Sally Fitzgerald, was published as The Habit of Being. Much of O'Connor's best-known writing on religion, writing, and the South is contained in these and other letters.

In 1955, Betty Hester, an Atlanta file clerk, wrote O'Connor a letter expressing admiration for her work. Hester's letter drew O'Connor's attention, and they corresponded frequently. For The Habit of Being, Hester provided Fitzgerald with all the letters she received from O'Connor but requested that her identity be kept private; she was identified only as "A." The complete collection of the unedited letters between O'Connor and Hester was unveiled by Emory University in May 2007; the letters had been given to the university in 1987 with the stipulation that they not be released to the public for 20 years.

Emory University also contains the more than 600 letters O'Connor wrote to her mother, Regina, nearly every day while she was pursuing her literary career in Iowa City, New York, and Massachusetts. Some of these describe "travel itineraries and plumbing mishaps, ripped stockings and roommates with loud radios," as well as her request for the homemade mayonnaise of her childhood. O'Connor lived with her mother for 34 of her 39 years of life.

Catholicism
O'Connor was a devout Catholic. From 1956 through 1964, she wrote more than one hundred book reviews for two Catholic diocesan newspapers in Georgia: The Bulletin and The Southern Cross. According to fellow reviewer Joey Zuber, the wide range of books she chose to review demonstrated that she was profoundly intellectual. Her reviews consistently confronted  Catholicism-defined theological and ethical themes in books written by the most serious and demanding Catholic theologians of her time. Professor of English Carter Martin, an authority on O'Connor's writings, notes simply that her "book reviews are at one with her religious life".

A prayer journal O'Connor had kept during her time at the University of Iowa was published in 2013. It included prayers and ruminations on faith, writing, and O'Connor's relationship with God.

Enjoyment of birds
O'Connor frequently used bird imagery within her fiction.

When she was six, O'Connor experienced her first brush with celebrity status. Pathé News filmed "Little Mary O'Connor" with her trained chicken and showed the film around the country. She said: "When I was six I had a chicken that walked backward and was in the Pathé News. I was in it too with the chicken. I was just there to assist the chicken but it was the high point in my life. Everything since has been an anticlimax."

In high school, when the girls were required to sew Sunday dresses for themselves, O'Connor sewed a full outfit of underwear and clothes to fit her pet duck and brought the duck to school to model it.

As an adult at Andalusia, she raised and nurtured some 100 peafowl. Fascinated by birds of all kinds, she raised ducks, ostriches, emus, toucans, and any sort of exotic bird she could obtain, while incorporating images of peacocks into her books. She described her peacocks in an essay titled "The King of the Birds".

Legacy, awards, and tributes
O'Connor's Complete Stories won the 1972 U.S. National Book Award for Fiction and, in a 2009 online poll, was named the best book ever to have won the National Book Awards.

In June 2015, the United States Postal Service honored O'Connor with a new postage stamp, the 30th issuance in the Literary Arts series. Some criticized the stamp as failing to reflect O'Connor's character and legacy.

She was inducted into the Savannah Women of Vision investiture in 2016.

The Flannery O'Connor Award for Short Fiction, named in honor of O'Connor by the University of Georgia Press, is a prize given annually since 1983 to an outstanding collection of short stories.

In 1998, New Jersey rock artist Bruce Springsteen published the song A Good Man Is Hard to Find (Pittsburgh), based on the aforementioned short story. This was a recording from 1982. 

The Flannery O'Connor Book Trail is a series of Little Free Libraries stretching between O'Connor's homes in Savannah and Milledgeville.

The Flannery O'Connor Childhood Home is a historic house museum in Savannah, Georgia, where O'Connor lived during her childhood. In addition to serving as a museum, the house hosts regular events and programs.

Loyola University Maryland had a student dormitory named for O'Connor. In 2020, Flannery O'Connor Hall was renamed in honor of activist Sister Thea Bowman. The announcement also mentions, "This renaming comes after recent recognition of Flannery O’Connor, a 20th century Catholic American writer, and the racism present in some of her work."

The film, Flannery: The Storied Life of the Writer from Georgia has been described as the story of a writer "who wrestled with the greater mysteries of existence"

Works

Novels
 Wise Blood (1952)
 The Violent Bear It Away (1960)

Short story collections
 A Good Man Is Hard to Find and Other Stories (1955)
 Everything That Rises Must Converge (1965)
 The Complete Stories (1971)

Other works
 Mystery and Manners: Occasional Prose (1969)
 The Habit of Being: Letters of Flannery O'Connor (1979)
 The Presence of Grace: and Other Book Reviews (1983)
 Flannery O'Connor: Collected Works (1988)
 Flannery O'Connor: The Cartoons (2012)
 A Prayer Journal (2013)

References

Citations

Works cited

Further reading

General

Biographies

Criticism and cultural impact

Scholarly guides

External links 

 The Flannery O'Connor Repository
 
 Flannery O'Connor reads short story A Good Man is Hard to Find (audio)
 Flannery O'Connor introduction to lecture, on Southern Grotesque.
 Flanner O'Connor cartoons

Library resources 
 Postmarked Milledgeville, a guide to archival collections of O'Connor's letters
Stuart A. Rose Manuscript, Archives, and Rare Book Library, Emory University: Flannery O'Connor papers, 1832–2003
Stuart A. Rose Manuscript, Archives, and Rare Book Library, Emory University: Flannery O'Connor collection, c. 1937–2003
Stuart A. Rose Manuscript, Archives, and Rare Book Library, Emory University: Letters to Betty Hester, 1955–1964

1925 births
1964 deaths
20th-century American novelists
20th-century American women writers
20th-century American short story writers
20th-century American essayists
American feminists
American environmentalists
American Roman Catholic religious writers
American women environmentalists
American women essayists
American women novelists
American women short story writers
Burials at Memory Hill Cemetery
Christian novelists
Critics of Objectivism (Ayn Rand)
Deaths from lupus
Ecofeminists
Georgia College & State University alumni
Iowa Writers' Workshop alumni
National Book Award winners
Novelists from Georgia (U.S. state)
O. Henry Award winners
People from Milledgeville, Georgia
People from Ridgefield, Connecticut
University of Iowa alumni
Women religious writers
Writers from Savannah, Georgia
Writers of American Southern literature
Catholics from Connecticut
Catholics from Georgia (U.S. state)
Virtue ethicists
Writers with disabilities
Writers of Gothic fiction
American people of Irish descent
Yaddo alumni